Oliver David Whiteside Stapleton (born 12 April 1948), BSC  is an English cinematographer.

Life and career
He graduated from the University of Cape Town in 1970 with a degree in psychology and from the National Film and Television School (NFTS) UK while working in South Africa (from 1966 to 1974) and England.

One of his first efforts was the student film Shadowplay, a film about South African immigrants trying to adjust to life in London, which he wrote, directed, and edited. He progressed to filming music videos and commercials. He worked with many famous bands in the early-to-mid 80s, including a-ha, David Bowie, The Rolling Stones, Eddy Grant and The Human League.

Awards
1986 – won MTV Video Music Award for Best Cinematography for "The Sun Always Shines on T.V." by a-ha.
nominated for ACE Award for Danny, the Champion of the World.
1990 – nominated for Independent Spirit Award for Best Cinematography for Earth Girls Are Easy.
2001 – nominated for Camerimage Golden Frog for Buffalo Soldiers.
2003 – nominated for AFI Award for Ned Kelly.

Filmography

References

External links
 Official website
 
 Stapleton's page on the Internet Encyclopedia of Cinematographers

1948 births
English cinematographers
Living people
Film people from London
University of Cape Town alumni
South African emigrants to the United Kingdom